The International Truck of the Year (ITOY) is an annual award made by the international transport sector.  Each year an expert jury, consisting of leading, authoritative specialist journalists, selects the International Truck of the Year from the new vehicles appearing on the European market.
At The 67th IAA Nutzfahrzeuge, IToY added new award: IToY Truck Innovation Award.

Recipients of the award

See also

 List of motor vehicle awards
 Bus & Coach of the Year

Notes

External links
 International Truck of the Year
ITOY awards 1977-2008

Commercial vehicle awards
Motor vehicle awards
Trucks